John Edward Schoon (born July 9, 1929), was an American politician who was a member of the Oregon House of Representatives.

He was born in Gary, Indiana and attended the University of Maryland and Portland State University, earning Bachelor of Science and Master of Business Administration degrees. He was a banker, working with First National Bank Oregon, in Salem. Schoon also served in the United States Marine Corps, earning an Air Medal. His brother, Dick Schoon, served in the Washington House of Representatives.

References

1929 births
Living people
Republican Party members of the Oregon House of Representatives
Politicians from Gary, Indiana
Politicians from Salem, Oregon
University of Maryland, College Park alumni
United States Marines